Sibirocosa sibirica is a species of wolf spider. It has a fairly wide distribution in Siberia: from the Putorana Plateau east to the Chersky Range and south to northern Transbaikal.

This spider has a body length of up to 6.5 mm. It is usually brown in colour, though it is quite variable. There are few external distinguishing marks although the male has a light coloured heart-shaped mark and two rows of white spots on the abdomen. It can only be distinguished with certainty from related species by details of the genitalia.

References

Lycosidae
Spiders of Russia
Fauna of Siberia
Spiders described in 1908
Taxa named by Władysław Kulczyński